James Grattan (born 30 November 1958) is a Northern Irish former professional footballer who played in the Football League for Mansfield Town.

References

1958 births
Living people
English footballers
Association football forwards
English Football League players
Sunderland A.F.C. players
Mansfield Town F.C. players
FC Istres players
Linfield F.C. players
Crusaders F.C. players
Association footballers from Belfast